The 1901–02 Football League season was Small Heath Football Club's tenth in the Football League and their third in the First Division, having been promoted as runners-up in the Second Division in 1900–01. They finished in 17th place in the 18-team league, one point away from safety, so were relegated back to the Second Division. They also took part in the 1901–02 FA Cup, entering at the intermediate round (between qualifying rounds and rounds proper) and losing in that round to Portsmouth. In locally organised competition, they lost to Aston Villa in the first round of the Birmingham Senior Cup.

Twenty-six players made at least one appearance in nationally organised first-team competition, and there were eleven different goalscorers. Goalkeeper Nat Robinson was ever-present over the 35-match season; full-back Archie Goldie and half-back Alex Leake each missed only one match. Bob McRoberts was leading scorer with 24 goals, of which 19 came in the league.

Football League First Division

League table (part)

FA Cup

Appearances and goals

Players with name struck through and marked  left the club during the playing season.

See also
Birmingham City F.C. seasons

References
General
 Matthews, Tony (1995). Birmingham City: A Complete Record. Breedon Books (Derby). .
 Matthews, Tony (2010). Birmingham City: The Complete Record. DB Publishing (Derby). .
 Source for match dates and results: "Birmingham City 1901–1902: Results". Statto Organisation. Retrieved 23 May 2012.
 Source for lineups, appearances, goalscorers and attendances: Matthews (2010), Complete Record, pp. 248–49. Note that attendance figures are estimated.
 Source for kit: "Birmingham City". Historical Football Kits. Retrieved 22 May 2018.

Specific

Birmingham City F.C. seasons
Small Heath